Fruit 'n Fibre is a breakfast cereal produced by Kellogg's and sold in various countries. It consists of wheat flakes, dried fruit (sultanas, raisins, coconut, banana, and apple) and hazelnuts. Similar cereals are produced by other companies under similar names, such as Fruit & Fibre. The Kellogg's version is also known as Optima Fruit & Fibre in some markets (this name was used in the UK for a short period from 1997, but was eventually changed back).

References

External links
 
 Tesco Fruit & Fibre
 Bran Cereal Muffins made with Post Fruit & Fibre

Kellogg's cereals